The following is a list of players in Switzerland's men's ice hockey team.

Rosters

Junior Men (U20) 2016 Bronze Medal team

Goalies

Defence

Offence

Staff

References

Ice hockey teams in Switzerland